The Vietnam General Confederation of Labour (VGCL) is the sole national trade union center in Vietnam. It was founded 29 July 1929 as the Red Workers' General Union in Northern Vietnam, and extended into the entire country after the collapse of South Vietnam in 1975.

The VGCL's role, as shown on the Vietnamese side of its website, includes a "responsibility to implement the party's directions and policies and to contribute to the party's development". It is under the oversight of the Communist Party: "The party oversees the way the VGCL implements the party's directions and policies."

All trade unions in Vietnam are required by law to affiliate to the VGCL, and the VGCL is one of the mass movements of the Vietnamese Fatherland Front. Bui Van Cuong, the VGCL president, is a member of the Communist Party of Vietnam Central Committee.

The VGCL is affiliated to the World Federation of Trade Unions. In 2011 VGCL President Bui Van Cuong was elected a WFTU Vice-President.

Organization 

The VGCL is composed of 63 local federations of labor, representing cities and provinces.

Affiliated unions 
There are 20 affiliated National Industrial Unions:
Vietnam National Union of Post and Telecom Workers
Vietnam National Union of Petroleum and Gas Workers
Vietnam National Education Union
Vietnam National Union of Industrial and Commercial Workers
Vietnam National Union of Electricity Workers
Vietnam National Union of Railway Workers
Vietnam National Union of Transport Workers
Vietnam National Union of Aviation Workers
Vietnam National Union of Maritime Workers
Vietnam National Union of Banking Workers
Vietnam National Union of Building Workers
Vietnam National Union of Health Workers
Vietnam National Union of Agricultural & Rural Development Workers
Vietnam Public Sector Union
Vietnam National Union of Rubber Workers
Vietnam National Union of Coal and Mineral Workers
Trade Union Committee of People's Police
Trade Union Committee of National Defense

References

External links
Official website
Official newspaper

Trade unions in Vietnam
World Federation of Trade Unions
Trade unions established in 1929